Goodenia strangfordii, commonly known as wide-leaved goodenia in the Northern Territory, is a species of flowering plant in the family Goodeniaceae and is endemic to northern Australia. It is an erect herb with narrow elliptic to lance-shaped stem leaves with the narrower end towards the base, and racemes of yellow flowers.

Description
Flowering mainly occurs from May to October.

Taxonomy and naming
Goodenia strangfordii was first formally described in 1867 by Ferdinand von Mueller in Fragmenta phytographiae Australiae. The specific epithet (strangfordii) honours Percy Smythe, the 8th Viscount Strangford.

Distribution and habitat
This goodenia grows in heavy, seasonally wet soil in the Northern Territory, Queensland and the far north-east of Western Australia.

Conservation status
Goodenia strangfordii is classified as of "least concern" in the Northern Territory and Queensland but as "Priority One" by the Government of Western Australia Department of Parks and Wildlife, meaning that it is known from only one or a few locations which are potentially at risk.

References

strangfordii
Eudicots of Western Australia
Flora of the Northern Territory
Flora of Queensland
Taxa named by Ferdinand von Mueller
Plants described in 1867